Brka is a village in the municipality of Brčko, Bosnia and Herzegovina. It is also a name of the river, right tributary of river Sava, flowing through municipality of Brčko and emptying into Sava within city limits of Brčko.

Demographics 
According to the 2013 census, its population was 2,234.

References

Villages in Brčko District